Reginald Aaron "Reggie" Hodges (born January 26, 1982) is a former American football punter. He was drafted by the St. Louis Rams in the sixth round of the 2005 NFL Draft. He played college football at Ball State.

Hodges has been a member of the Cleveland Browns, Philadelphia Eagles, Indianapolis Colts, Seattle Seahawks, New England Patriots, New York Jets and Tennessee Titans.

Early years
Hodges earned First-team All-state honors in Illinois as a senior at Centennial High School, averaging 39.4 yards per punt.

College career
Hodges took over punting duties as a freshman at Ball State, going on to set a school-career record with 254 attempts. His 10,210 yards ranked second in school history at the time of his graduation. He was named First-team All-MAC selection as a senior, leading conference with 73 punts (42.6 avg).

Professional career

St. Louis Rams
The St. Louis Rams drafted Hodges in the sixth round (210th overall) of the 2005 NFL Draft. He was signed to a three-year contract on July 27, 2005. Hodges won the Rams' punting job out of training camp, beating out veteran Bryan Barker. Hodges went on to appear in five games for the Rams, averaging 38.0 yards and 31.0 net yards in 22 attempts. Hodges' poor performance caused the team to release him on October 10 and re-sign Barker for the remainder of the season.

Philadelphia Eagles
On November 2, 2005, Philadelphia Eagles head coach Andy Reid said the team would sign Hodges to replace Dirk Johnson, who was out with a hernia. Hodges appeared in three games for the Eagles, averaging 36.8 yards in 19 punts with one blocked. He was waived by the team November 22. He spent the rest of the 2005 season out of football.

The Eagles re-signed Hodges to a two-year future contract on January 13, 2006. The deal included base salaries of $310,000 (2006) and $385,000 (2007). However, he did not play in the team's first preseason game and was waived on August 8.

Indianapolis Colts
On August 18, 2006, the Indianapolis Colts signed Hodges, however he failed to beat out longtime Colts punter Hunter Smith for the job and was released on September 3. He spent the 2006 season out of football.

The Colts re-signed Hodges to a three-year contract on February 23, 2007. He again lost out to Smith for the Colts' punting job, failing to appear in the team's first two preseason games before being released on August 23. He spent the season out of football.

Seattle Seahawks
After failing to make an NFL team for each of the past two seasons, Hodges signed with the Seattle Seahawks on April 11, 2008. He was released by the team on August 30 during final cuts.

New England Patriots
On September 4, 2008, Hodges was signed to the practice squad of the New England Patriots. He was waived from it on September 7, 2008.

New York Jets
On September 17, 2008, Hodges was signed by the Jets to replace former punter Ben Graham, who was cut the day before. The Jets waived Hodges on April 27, 2009, and he was replaced by Eric Wilbur. He was re-signed on June 10, 2009.

Tennessee Titans
On September 23, 2009, Hodges was signed by the Tennessee Titans to replace punter Craig Hentrich. He was waived on October 27.

Cleveland Browns

Hodges was signed by the Cleveland Browns on November 15, 2009 after punter Dave Zastudil was listed as inactive for the game against the Baltimore Ravens. Zastudil was later placed on injured reserve on November 18, making Hodges the only punter on the roster.  Zastudil was again placed on injured reserve on August 17, 2010 after the knee recovered poorly from surgery.

During the Browns' October 24, 2010 game against the New Orleans Saints, Hodges took a fake punt and ran it 68 yards to the Saints' 10-yard line. This run is currently the longest run by a punter in NFL history, and it was the longest run by a member of the Cleveland Browns during the 2010 season.

On November 27, 2010 Hodges signed a 2-year deal, keeping him with the Browns through 2012.

On August 2, 2011 while practicing at the Cleveland Browns Training Facility in Berea, Ohio Hodges suffered a torn left Achilles tendon, falling to the ground as soon as he planted his non-kicking foot in the end zone during a special teams drill. He was immediately called out for the season and placed on injured reserve.

Personal
Hodges has the distinction of being one of the few African-American punters in NFL history. He is also the Vice President of Fuzion Sports.

References

External links 

Indianapolis Colts bio
New England Patriots bio
New York Jets bio

1982 births
Living people
Players of American football from Illinois
African-American players of American football
American football punters
Ball State Cardinals football players
St. Louis Rams players
Philadelphia Eagles players
Indianapolis Colts players
Seattle Seahawks players
New England Patriots players
New York Jets players
Tennessee Titans players
Cleveland Browns players
21st-century African-American sportspeople
20th-century African-American people
Ed Block Courage Award recipients